A by-election was held for the New South Wales Legislative Assembly electorate of Parramatta on 10 April 1861 caused by the resignation of sitting member James Byrnes. At the election in December 1860 he gained second place behind a newcomer John Lackey. While still successful, Byrnes took offence at being placed second, stating that the majority of voters had decided that he was not fit to serve them and resigned in March 1861 without taking his seat.

Dates

Candidates

 Charles Kemp was a journalist and businessman. He was a former member for Liverpool Plains who had been defeated at the election in December 1860.

 Arthur Holroyd was a barrister and former member for Western Boroughs.

 John Harrington West was a one-time candidate and very little is known about him. His nomination speech was greeted with much laughter, which suggests his candidacy was intended to be humorous. He did however hold a meeting to set out his political principles, and at the nominations the show of hands was declared to be in his favour.

Results

See also
Electoral results for the district of Parramatta
List of New South Wales state by-elections

References

1861 elections in Australia
New South Wales state by-elections
1860s in New South Wales